Aboubacar Sissoko (born 9 October 1995) is a Malian professional footballer who currently plays for Canadian Premier League side Forge FC.

Early life
Sissoko was born in Bamako, Mali and moved to Montreal, Quebec in 2006 when his father, a diplomat, was posted there.

He began playing youth soccer with CS Mont-Royal Outremont, later joining Longueuil. In 2015, he won the Silver Ball with the U21 team of CS Mont-Royal Outremont in the LSEQ U21 division. In 2016, he played at the senior amateur level in the LSEQ with CS Panellinios.

University career
In 2015, he began attending the Université de Montréal, where he played for the Carabins men's soccer team, joining his brother who also played for the team. He was named the Carabins' Rookie of the Year in 2015. In 2017, he was named captain of the team.

He helped the Carabins win reach the national championship three years in a row from 2017 to 2019, helping them win their first national title in 2018, as well as silver medals in 2017 and 2019. He was an RSEQ First Team All-Star three times from 2017 to 2019, as well as a U Sports First Team All-Star in 2019. He was also named an RSEQ Indoor First-Team All-Star in 2017-18. 

After the 2019 season, he won the Joe Johnson Memorial Trophy as the most outstanding U Sports men's soccer player, after having been named the RSEQ Player of the Year earlier. He was also named the Montreal Carabins Athlete of the Year, across all of their sports teams.

In June 2020, he was named the U Sports Athlete of the Year for 2019-20. He became the first Carabin to ever win the honour. As part of the award, he earned a $10,000 schaolarship.

Club career
In 2014, he appeared with CS Longueuil in the Première ligue de soccer du Québec.
 
From 2017 to 2019, he played for CS St-Hubert in the Première ligue de soccer du Québec. In November 2018, at the 2018 CPL-U Sports Draft, Sissoko was selected 12th overall by Canadian Premier League club Forge FC. He attended pre-season with the club, but did not earn a contract. After leaving Forge, he returned to St-Hubert for another season in 2019, after which he departed the PLSQ club to begin his professional career.

In November 2019, he signed with HFX Wanderers FC of the Canadian Premier League, ahead of the 2020 season. In February 2020, after signing his contract, but before beginning the 2020 season, he went on trial with Major League Soccer club Vancouver Whitecaps FC. Originally, the trial was to last for three days, but it was continually extended, finally ending after six weeks, after which he returned to join the Wanderers. In his third match on August 23, he earned Man of the Match honours against Cavalry FC. He helped the Wanderers reach the 2020 CPL Final, where they were defeated by Forge FC. He led the league with a 91% dribbling success rate that season. He was also named to the CanPL.ca 2020 Best XI.

In February 2021, he joined USL Championship club Indy Eleven.

In February 2022, he returned to the Canadian Premier League, signing with Forge FC. He made his debut for the club in a 2022 CONCACAF Champions League match against Cruz Azul on February 16. He won the league title with Forge in 2022.

International career
Sissoko represented the Mali U20 team at the 2015 African U-20 Championship qualification tournament in 2014. After returning to Canada following it, he was diagnosed with malaria and fell into a three-day coma.

Personal
While representing the Mali U20 team, Sissoko, along with his mother and sister, paid for the construction of two water wells in an arid rural area of Mali and later formed the Macine Foundation (named in honour of his parents) with his sister and two brothers, as a water-supplying charity, and have built additional wells.

Career statistics

References

External links
Montreal Carabins profile

1995 births
Living people
Association football midfielders
Malian footballers
Canadian soccer players
Sportspeople from Bamako
Soccer players from Montreal
Black Canadian soccer players
Naturalized citizens of Canada
Université de Montréal alumni
HFX Wanderers FC players
Indy Eleven players
Première ligue de soccer du Québec players
Canadian Premier League players
Mali youth international footballers
Forge FC draft picks
21st-century Malian people
Forge FC players
CS St-Hubert players
CS Longueuil players